John A. "Jack" Sanford (26 July 1929 – 17 October 2005) was an American Jungian analyst and Episcopal priest.

Early life

John A. Sanford was born in Moorestown, New Jersey, a township in Burlington County. His parents were both leaders in the spiritual healing movement. His father, Edgar L. Sanford, was born in Vermont in 1890 and was an Episcopal priest, as was his own father and grandfather. He was the author of God's Healing Power. His mother was Agnes Sanford (born Agnes Mary White; 1897-1982) who was born in China. She became the founder of the Inner Healing Movement and was the author of The Healing Light. His siblings were Edgar L. Sanford Jr. (born in China in 1925) and Virginia F. Sanford (born in Pennsylvania in 1926).

In his early 20s, Sanford decided to follow his father, grandfather, and two great-grandfathers, and entered the Episcopal Theological Seminary in Cambridge, Massachusetts, to study to be an Episcopal priest. He earned a bachelor's degree in philosophy, graduating Phi Beta Kappa at Kenyon College in Gambier, Ohio. Later on, he obtained an honorary Doctor of Divinity degree from Kenyon, based on his work in the fields of religion and psychology. He studied and mastered Greek mythology, Greek language, and American Indian history.

Psychoanalytic experience and training
In 1955, he was ordained a priest at the Episcopal Theological Seminary in Cambridge, Massachusetts. Later he was deeply influenced by his mentor, Fritz Künkel, himself a disciple of Carl Jung the Swiss psychiatrist and founder of Analytical psychology, of whom Sanford was also a devoted student.
 
His first ordained ministry position was as assistant priest at St. Luke's Parish in Monrovia, California in 1955. He became rector at Trinity Church in Los Angeles in 1958.

Personal life
Sanford and his wife, Adaline "Lynn", whom he married in 1954, grew weary of the downtown Los Angeles environment and its declining air quality. When he was offered a position at St. Paul's Cathedral near Balboa Park in 1965 he welcomed the move to San Diego.

Sanford worked as a parish priest for 19 years. In 1974, he left parochial ministry for full-time work as a Jungian analyst and psychotherapist, lecturing and authoring a series of books, most of them regarding religion, psychology, Greek mythology, and American Indian history.

Since those years, Sanford enjoyed his private practice as an analyst focusing on psychology, religion and inner growth and he found some time every day for writing his books. He was a mentor for the Journey into Wholeness conferences from their beginning in 1977.

Sanford authored books on serious dream study and interpretation, combining both spirituality and science.

On the lighter side, Sanford also wrote novels, reflecting his interest in American Indian history, lore and legend. He also wrote a piece in an entirely different area: Running with your dogs, in which he reflected an extension of his passion for long-distance running. He ran consistently into his early 70s and completed the Mission Bay Marathon in the 1970s. He was also an avid hiker, backpacking in the Sierras for many years.

Sanford's children are Kathryn and John Stuart Sanford.

Final days and death

During 2002 and 2003, Sanford started showing symptoms of Alzheimer's disease, which became worse with time, so the family decided to move him to a retirement house named Silverado Senior Living in Escondido, California, where he lived his final years and where he died on October 17, 2005, at the age of 76, from Alzheimer's complications.

Selected bibliography
1968 Dreams: God's Forgotten Language
1970 The Kingdom Within: A Study of the Inner Meaning of Jesus’ Sayings 
1974 The Man Who Wrestled with God: Light from the Old Testament on the Psychology of Individuation
1977 Healing and Wholeness
1978 Dreams and Healing
1980 The Invisible Partners: How the Male and Female in Each of Us Affects Our Relationships
1981 Evil: The Shadow Side of Reality
1981 The Strange Trial of Mr Hyde: A New Look at the Nature of Human Evil
1982 Between People: Communicating One-To-One
1982 Ministry Burnout 
1983 The Man Who Lost His Shadow
1984 Fritz Kunkel: Selected Writings: Edited, with an Introduction and Commentary by John A. Sanford
1985 King Saul, the Tragic Hero: A Study in Individuation
1986 The Song of the Meadowlark: The Story of an American Indian and the Nez Perce War
1987 The Kingdom Within: The Inner Meaning of Jesus' Sayings, First Published in 1970
1988 What Men are Like (Co-authored by George Lough, Ph.D.)
1991 Soul Journey: A Jungian Analyst Looks at Reincarnation
1992 Healing Body and Soul
1994 Mystical Christianity: A Psychological Commentary on the Gospel of John
1995 Fate, Love, and Ecstasy: Wisdom from the Lesser-Known Goddesses of the Greeks

External links
Obituary with biographical notes
Profiles in Jungian-Christian Dialogue: Sanford video interview
Video interview with Sanford
OPUS Archives and Research Center archival collection of Sanford's published work
Online obituary with biographical notes
Photo of Sanford's view of Census Image

1929 births
2005 deaths
20th-century Christian mystics
21st-century Christian mystics
American Episcopal priests
American Christian mystics
American psychoanalysts
20th-century American psychologists
American spiritual writers
Jungian psychologists
Kenyon College alumni
Protestant mystics